William, Will, Bill or Billy Dean may refer to:

Arts and entertainment
 William Dean Howells (1837–1920), American novelist and playwright
 Bill Dean (1921–2000), British actor
 Billy Dean (born 1962), American country music singer
 Billy Dean (album), his 1991 album

Sports
 William Dean (Hampshire cricketer) (c. 1882–?), Australian cricketer
 William Henry Dean (1887–1949), English water polo player
 Dixie Dean (William Dean, 1907–1980), English footballer
 William Dean (Somerset cricketer) (1926–1994), English cricketer
 Bill Dean (baseball), American baseball player
 Will Dean (rower) (born 1987), Canadian rower
 Will Dean (footballer) (born 2000), English footballer

Others
 William Dean (priest) (died 1588), English priest and martyr
 William Dean (engineer) (1840–1905), British railway engineer
 William Reginald Dean (1896–1973), British applied mathematician
 William F. Dean (1899–1981), United States Army general
 William D. Dean (born 1940), American politician and television producer
 Billy Dean Anderson (1934–1979), American criminal
 Will Dean (entrepreneur) (born 1980), English business founder
 Bill Dean (politician), American legislator

Other uses
 William Dean Chocolates, American confectioner

See also
 William the Dean, 13th century Scottish bishop
 William Deane (born 1931), Governor-General of Australia from 1996 to 2001
 Billy Deans (disambiguation)